Jewish University may refer to:

American Jewish University, Los Angeles, formerly University of Judaism and Brandeis-Bardin Institute
Karaite Jewish University